Positivity may refer to:
 The degree to which something is positive 
 Positive charge, a type of electric charge
 Positivity/negativity ratio
 Positivity effect
 Positivity offset

Music
 "Positivity", a song by Prince on his Lovesexy album
 "Positivity", a song by Stevie Wonder and his daughter Aisha Morris on his A Time to Love album
 "Positivity", a song by Ashley Tisdale on Headstrong (Ashley Tisdale album)
 "Positivity" (Suede song), a song by Suede

See also 
Positivism
Positivism (disambiguation)